Outlaws and Angels may also refer to:

 Outlaws and Angels, is an album by American country and western musician Willie Nelson
 Outlaws and Angels (film), an American film